Potter Hollow District No. 19 School is a historic one-room school building located near Potter Hollow, Albany County, New York.  It was built in 1853, and is a 1 1/2-story, rectangular timber frame building on a stone foundation.  It is three bays wide and five bays wide, with a steeply pitched gable roof and belfry.

It was listed on the U.S. National Register of Historic Places in 2012.

References

One-room schoolhouses in New York (state)
School buildings on the National Register of Historic Places in New York (state)
School buildings completed in 1853
Schools in Albany County, New York
National Register of Historic Places in Albany County, New York